Filmic Entertainment is an American film studio, located in Los Angeles, California. The company specializes in the development and production of documentary films, having created films with HBO, Samuel Goldwyn Films, The Orchard, and 1091 Pictures.

Filmography

References

External links

 

American film studios
Film production companies of the United States
Entertainment companies established in 2011